Denis Rivière (1945 – 25 January 2020) was a French painter.

Biography
Rivière had a great interest in classical art. A trip to Egypt helped inspire him to trace images in a certain manner. He was passionate about developing subtleties in the skies.

His paintings were acquired by several national museums and art centers such as the FRAC Centre and the Élysée Palace.

Denis Rivière died on 25 January 2020.

Expositions
Espace Electra, Paris, 2000
Galerie van Remmen, Solingen, 2000
Kunsthanlung Kugel, Duisburg, 2000
Art-gallery, Wiesbaden, 2000
Bibliothèque de l’Université du Littoral Côte d’Opale, Dunkirk, 2000
“ciel aux quotidiens” galerie Lefor Openo, Paris, 2002
Galerie Samedi, Montfort-l'Amaury, 2002
Salles Saint Pierre -La Fabrique, Avallon, 2003
L’Arsenal-Musée, Soissons, 2003
La Galerie Jaune, Le Mans, 2004
Maison Jean de La Fontaine, Château-Thierry, 2005
Galerie Samedi, Montford-l'Amaury, 2005
366 ciels, Quimperlé, 2005
salle St. Jacques Saint-Quentin, Saint-Quentin, 2006
Galerie Duchoze, Rouen, 2006
Espace APcis, Maisons-Alfort, 2006
Galerie F.G.Conzen, Düsseldorf, 2008
Panorama Museum, Bad Frankenhausen, 2008
Musée de Soissons, Soissons, 2008
Galerie D. Duchoze, Rouen, 2008
Galerie Jamault, Paris, 2008
Galerie F.G. Conzen, Düsseldorf, 2008
Galerie Pallade, Lyon, 2009
Galerie Patrice Peltier, Le Mans, 2009
Galerie Danièle Bourdette, Honfleur, 2010
APACC, Montreuil, 2011
Maison des Arts et Loisirs, Laon, 2012
Galerie Detai, Paris, 2013
Galerie Anne-Marie et Roland Pallade, Lyon, 2014
Galerie Patrice Peltier, Paris, 2014

References

1945 births
2020 deaths
20th-century French painters
20th-century French male artists
21st-century French painters
21st-century French male artists